is a speed skater, and he is the older brother of late speed skater Yukinori Miyabe.

World records 

Source: SpeedSkatingStats.com

References

External links
 
 Yasunori Miyabe at SpeedSkatingStats.com
 
 

1966 births
Living people
Japanese male speed skaters
Olympic speed skaters of Japan
Speed skaters at the 1992 Winter Olympics
Speed skaters at the 1994 Winter Olympics
Speed skaters at the 1990 Asian Winter Games
Asian Games medalists in speed skating
Asian Games bronze medalists for Japan
Medalists at the 1990 Asian Winter Games
Universiade medalists in speed skating
World Sprint Speed Skating Championships medalists
Universiade silver medalists for Japan
Competitors at the 1991 Winter Universiade